5-Decyne, also known as dibutylethyne, is a type of alkyne with a triple bond at its fifth carbon (the '5-' indicates the location of the triple bond in the chain). Its formula is C10H18. Its density at 25 °C and otherwise standard conditions is 0.766 g/ml. The boiling point is 177 °C. The average molar mass is 138.25 g/mol.

5-Decyne forms a group of symmetric alkynes with 4-octyne, 3-hexyne, and  2-butyne.

See also
 1-Decyne

References 

Alkynes